Simona Burbaitė  (born 13 February 1992) is model, blogger and DJ. Also a participant and 1st runner-up of the competition Miss Lietuva 2013  elected as Miss Universe Lithuania 2013 and was represented her country at the 2013 Miss Universe pageants.

Miss Universe Lithuania 2013
Simona Burbaitė was chosen as 1st Runner-up at Miss Universe Lietuva 2013 pageant. It was held at the Palanga Summer Stage in Palanga, Lithuania on August 15, 2013.

References

External links
Official Miss Lithuania website

Living people
Miss Universe 2013 contestants
Lithuanian beauty pageant winners
1991 births